Barbara Mulej (born 29 May 1974) is a Slovenian former professional tennis player.

Mulej won eleven singles titles and one doubles title on the ITF Circuit in her career. On 13 June 1994, she reached her best singles ranking of world No. 111. On 2 February 1991, she peaked at No. 474 in the doubles rankings.

Playing for Slovenia Fed Cup team, Mulej has accumulated a win–loss record of 19–8.

ITF finals

Singles: 17 (11–6)

Doubles: 1 (1-0)

References

External links
 
 

1974 births
Living people
Slovenian female tennis players
Sportspeople from Kranj
Yugoslav female tennis players